Italy competed at the 2004 Summer Olympics in Athens, Greece, from the 13th to the 29th of August 2004. The country has competed at every Summer Olympic games in the modern era, except for the 1904 Summer Olympics in St. Louis. The Italian National Olympic Committee (Italian: Comitato Olimpico Nazionale Italiano, CONI) sent the nation's largest ever delegation in history to the Games. A total of 364 athletes, 229 men and 135 women, competed in 27 sports.

Medalists

|  style="text-align:left; width:72%; vertical-align:top;"|

|  style="text-align:left; width:23%; vertical-align:top;"|

Archery 

Three Italian archers qualified each for the men's and women's individual archery, and a spot each for both men's and women's teams. Marco Galiazzo earned the first archery gold medal in Italy's history. On his way to the final, he defeated countryman Ilario Di Buò in the round of 16. The three men did well enough in the ranking round to receive a bye in the first round of team competition, but were defeated by the United States in their first team match.

Athletics 

Italian athletes have so far achieved qualifying standards in the following athletics events (up to a maximum of 3 athletes in each event at the 'A' Standard, and 1 at the 'B' Standard).

Key
 Note–Ranks given for track events are within the athlete's heat only
 Q = Qualified for the next round
 q = Qualified for the next round as a fastest loser or, in field events, by position without achieving the qualifying target
 NR = National record
 N/A = Round not applicable for the event
 Bye = Athlete not required to compete in round

Men
Track & road events

Field events

Combined events – Decathlon

Women
Track & road events

Field events

Baseball

The Italian baseball team tied for 7th in the preliminary round and did not advance to the semifinals.

Roster
Manager: 30 – Giampiero Faraone

Coaches: 8 – Claudio Corradi, 12 – Manuel Cortina, 27 – Salvatore Varriale.

Round robin

Basketball

Men's tournament

Roster

Group play

Quarterfinal

Semifinal

Gold medal game

 Won silver medal

Boxing

Italy sent six boxers to Athens, winning a bronze medal to join a five-way tie for 16th place in the boxing medals count. Both boxers that had matches in the round of 32 won those bouts, (two more had byes). Four boxers won in the round of 16 to advance to quarterfinals, while two fell in that round. Only the super heavyweight Roberto Cammarelle survived the quarterfinal round, not falling until the semifinals to win the bronze medal. The combined record of the Italian boxers was 7-6.

Canoeing

Slalom

Sprint

Cycling

Road
Men

Women

Track
Omnium

Mountain biking

Diving 

Italian divers qualified for eight individual spots at the 2004 Olympic Games.

Men

Women

Equestrian

Eventing

"#" indicates that the score of this rider does not count in the team competition, since only the best three results of a team are counted.

Show jumping

Fencing

Twelve Italian fencers (seven men and five women) qualified for the following events:

Men

Women

Football

Men's tournament

Roster

Group play

Quarterfinal

Semifinal

Bronze Medal Final

 Won bronze medal

Gymnastics

Artistic
Men
Team

Individual finals

Women

Rhythmic

Trampoline

Judo

Nine Italian judoka (four men and five women) qualified for the following events.

Men

Women

Modern pentathlon

Four Italian athletes qualified to compete in the modern pentathlon event through the 2003 UIPM World Championships

Rowing

Italian rowers qualified the following boats:

Men

Women

Qualification Legend: FA=Final A (medal); FB=Final B (non-medal); FC=Final C (non-medal); FD=Final D (non-medal); FE=Final E (non-medal); FF=Final F (non-medal); SA/B=Semifinals A/B; SC/D=Semifinals C/D; SE/F=Semifinals E/F; R=Repechage

Sailing

Italian sailors have qualified one boat for each of the following events.

Men

Women

Open

M = Medal race; OCS = On course side of the starting line; DSQ = Disqualified; DNF = Did not finish; DNS= Did not start; RDG = Redress given

Shooting 

Men

Women

Softball 

Team Roster

Preliminary Round

Swimming 

Italian swimmers earned qualifying standards in the following events (up to a maximum of 2 swimmers in each event at the A-standard time, and 1 at the B-standard time):

Men

* Competed only in heats and received medals

Women

Synchronized swimming 

Nine Italian synchronized swimmers qualified a spot in the women's team.

Table tennis

Five Italian table tennis players qualified for the following events.

Taekwondo

Three Italian taekwondo jin qualified to compete.

Tennis

Six Italian tennis players (one male and five females) qualified to compete in the tennis tournament.

Men

Women

Triathlon

Italy was again represented by three triathletes at the 2004 event, but unlike in the first competition in 2000 all the Italians in 2004 were women. Gemignani, who had been the nation's best finisher four years earlier, dropped one place in the rankings. However, the two Olympic rookies both placed better than Gemignani had in the first race.

Volleyball

Beach

Indoor

Men's tournament

Roster

Group play

Quarterfinal

Semifinal

Gold Medal Final

 Won Silver Medal

Women's tournament

Roster

Group play

Quarterfinal

Water polo

Men's tournament

Roster

Group play

7th-10th Semifinal

7th-8th Place Final

Women's tournament

Roster

Group play

Quarterfinal

Semifinal

Gold Medal Final

 Won Gold Medal

Wrestling 

Key
  - Victory by Fall.
  - Decision by Points - the loser with technical points.
  - Decision by Points - the loser without technical points.

Men's freestyle

Men's Greco-Roman

Women's freestyle

See also
 Italy at the 2004 Summer Paralympics
 Italy at the 2005 Mediterranean Games

References

External links

Official Report of the XXVIII Olympiad
Italian National Olympic Committee

Nations at the 2004 Summer Olympics
2004
Summer Olympics